Alan Hunt (born 28 December 1968) was an English cricketer. He was a right-handed batsman who played for Gloucestershire. He was born in Birmingham.

Hunt, who also played for Worcestershire and Gloucestershire Second XIs, made a single first-class appearance for the team, during the 1991 season, against the touring Sri Lankans. He scored 3 runs in the first innings in which he batted, and 12 runs in the second.  He is married to Ngoc Tran, who works for Phidex.

External links
Alan Hunt at Cricket Archive 

1968 births
Living people
English cricketers
Gloucestershire cricketers